The Patriarchate of Cilicia is an ecclesiastical jurisdiction and the only patriarchate of the Armenian Catholic Church of the Catholic Church. The territorial jurisdiction of the Patriarch of Cilicia is the Archeparchy of Beirut, over which the Patriarch of Cilicia holds ordinary authority. The St. Elie and St. Gregory the Illuminator Armenian Catholic Cathedral in Beirut, Lebanon, is the cathedra of the Patriarchate. The Patriarchate is headed by Patriarch Raphaël Bedros XXI Minassian elected in September 2021.

History
While the diocese of Cilicia dates back to 294,
it was promoted to a patriarchate in 1742. In 1866, the seat of the patriarchate was moved to Constantinople, Ottoman Empire (now Istanbul, Turkey), and in 1928 to Beirut, Lebanon, where it remains today.

See also
 List of Armenian Catholic Patriarchs of Cilicia
 Council of Catholic Patriarchs of the East
 Armenian diaspora

References

External links
Official website

Cilicia
Cilicia
Cilicia